Yana Urqu (Quechua yana black, urqu mountain, "black mountain", hispanicized spelling Yanaorjo) is a mountain in the north of the Wansu mountain range in the Andes of Peru, about  high. It is situated in the Apurímac Region, Antabamba Province, Oropesa District. Yana Urqu lies southwest of Willkarana and Kisu Qutu.

References 

Mountains of Peru
Mountains of Apurímac Region